Roger Keith Kieschnick (born January 21, 1987) is an American former professional baseball outfielder. He has played in Major League Baseball (MLB) for the San Francisco Giants and Arizona Diamondbacks.

Early life
Born in Dallas, Texas, Kieschnick went to Rockwall High School in Rockwall, Texas.

College career
Kieschnick attended Texas Tech University, where he played college baseball. As a sophomore in 2007, he was named an All-Big 12 Conference performer. He played for the United States national baseball team and competed in the 2006 World University Baseball Championship winning gold, the 2007 Pan-American Games winning silver, and the 2007 World Port Tournament winning silver as well.

In his junior season at Texas Tech, he scored 47 runs and hit .305 with 15 doubles, three triples, 17 home runs and 65 RBI in 55 games played. Baseball America rated Kieschnick as the top position player from Texas in the 2008 Major League Baseball draft.

Professional career

San Francisco Giants
The Giants selected Kieschnick in the third round (82nd overall) of the 2008 MLB draft, and signed him in August.

With the High-A San Jose Giants in 2009, Kieschnick was a California League All-Star in his first professional season. He hit .296, with 23 home runs and 110 RBIs in 131 games. After hitting a home run that struck the Municipal Stadium (now Excite Ballpark) scoreboard and damaged a section, WalrusMan adopted him as his son.

He then spent two injury-plagued seasons in Double-A with the Richmond Flying Squirrels. In 2010, he hit .290 before going 0-for-30 in late May and early June, and was then placed on the disabled list for the rest of the season with a back injury. The 2011 season saw Kieschnick, who had played right field for the bulk of his young career, split time in left field for the first time. He led the Squirrels with 16 home runs and 65 RBIs and was named an Eastern League All-Star, but struggled with a recurring back injury in August which again ended his season prematurely.

Nonetheless, he was added to the parent club's 40-man roster after the 2011 season. and started the 2012 season in Triple-A with the Fresno Grizzlies.

Kieschnick was recalled from Fresno to join the major league ball club on July 30, 2013, and made his MLB debut in left field on July 31, 2013. He went 2-for-5 with two singles and two RBIs. His first MLB hit was against Kyle Kendrick of the Philadelphia Phillies. In 38 games with the Giants, he hit .202 with 5 RBI. After a subpar Spring training in 2014, where he hit .172 in 13 games, Kieschnick was designated for assignment on March 29 to make room on the 40-man roster.

Arizona Diamondbacks
Kieschnick was claimed off waivers by the Arizona Diamondbacks on April 4, 2014, and optioned to the Triple-A Reno Aces. He was recalled on April 24 when Mark Trumbo was placed on the disabled list. He made four appearances, going 0-for-7 before being optioned back to Reno. He was recalled on June 16 to replace the injured Bronson Arroyo and to add depth to a depleted outfield, missing Trumbo, A. J. Pollock, and Ender Inciarte. On June 17, Kieschnick hit his first MLB home run against Milwaukee Brewers closer Francisco Rodríguez.

Los Angeles Angels of Anaheim
The Los Angeles Angels of Anaheim claimed Kieschnick on waivers on October 7, 2014. He spent the entire season at the AAA level for the Angels, playing 108 games for the Salt Lake Bees.

Rojos del Águila de Veracruz
Kieschnick signed with the Rojos del Águila de Veracruz of the Mexican Baseball League for the 2016 season. He was released on April 29, 2016.

Retirement
On August 17, 2018, Kieschnick was announced as the UTSA assistant baseball coach, thus ending his playing career.

Personal life
He is the nephew of former Major Leaguer Brooks Kieschnick. Kieschnick is married to Claire Gibbs, Fightin’ Texas Aggie Class of 2009.

References

External links

1987 births
Living people
American expatriate baseball players in Mexico
Arizona Diamondbacks players
Arizona League Giants players
Baseball players at the 2007 Pan American Games
Baseball coaches from Texas
Baseball players from Dallas
Fresno Grizzlies players
Leones del Escogido players
American expatriate baseball players in the Dominican Republic
Major League Baseball right fielders
Major League Baseball left fielders
Mexican League baseball left fielders
Pan American Games medalists in baseball
Pan American Games silver medalists for the United States
Reno Aces players
Richmond Flying Squirrels players
Salt Lake Bees players
San Francisco Giants players
San Jose Giants players
Texas Tech Red Raiders baseball players
United States national baseball team players
UTSA Roadrunners baseball coaches
Waikiki Beach Boys players
Medalists at the 2007 Pan American Games
St. Cloud River Bats players